Thorne Lay (born 1956) is an American seismologist. He was born in Casper, Wyoming in 1956, and raised in El Paso, Texas. He is a  professor of earth and planetary sciences at the University of California, Santa Cruz.

Education 

Lay received a B.S. from the  University of Rochester in 1978, a M.S. from the California Institute of Technology in 1980, and a  Ph.D. also from  California Institute of Technology, in 1983.

Awards and academic honors 

 USTC Distinguished Lecture Series in Earth and Space Sciences, 2015
 IRIS/SSA Distinguished Lecturer, 2015
 Star on the Mountain Award, City of El Paso, Texas, 2015
 Fessinger-Springer Memorial Lecture, University of Texas El Paso, 2015
 Honorary Professor, Xi'an Jiaotong University, 2014
 Inge Lehmann Medal, American Geophysical Union, 2014
 Harry Fielding Reid Medal, Seismological Society of America, 2014
 Elected Member, National Academy of Sciences, 2014
 Gutenberg Lecturer of Seismology Section, American Geophysical Union, 2011
 Elected Fellow, American Association for the Advancement of Science, 2009
 Elected Fellow, American Academy of Arts and Sciences, 2008
 Lifetime National Associate of the National Academies of Science 2002
 Taiwan National Research Council Visiting Senior Scholar, 1997
 Japan Society for Promotion of Science Visiting Scholar, 1992
 Fellow, American Geophysical Union, 1991
 Macelwane Medal, American Geophysical Union, 1991

References

External links 

 
 

1956 births
Living people
Members of the United States National Academy of Sciences
University of California, Santa Cruz faculty
American seismologists